The Georgian Campaign was led by Alp Arslan who invaded Georgia in 1064.

In February 1064 Alp Arslan set out from Rey and divided his army into two divisions after crossing the Aras river. While he marched on Georgia the armies of Malik Shah and Nizam al-Mulk captured some Byzantine fortresses.

Alp Arslan at the head of the first column captured the region between Tbilisi and the Çoruh river. He captured Akhalkalaki in July the same year. He also captured Alaverdi after a heavy fight with the Georgians who were defending the city, the Georgian sovereign Bagrat could not face the Seljuks and fled. 

After this victory Alp Arslan received the title "Father of Conquest". Alp Arslan sent Bagrat IV a letter and offered him two options, one related to converting to Islam and the other related to an annual payment of jizya. Bagrat declared his submission to paying the annual jizya, however in 1065 the Georgians broke this agreement.  Alp Arslan led another campaign in Georgia in 1068.

References

Battles involving the Seljuk Empire
Battles involving the Kingdom of Georgia